The 2010–11 National League 2 North was the second season (twenty-fourth overall) of the fourth tier (north) of the English domestic rugby union competitions since the professionalised format of the second division was introduced.  The league system was 4 points for a win, 2 points for a draw and additional bonus points being awarded for scoring 4 or more tries and/or losing within 7 points of the victorious team. In terms of promotion the league champions would go straight up into National League 1 while the runners up would have a one-game playoff against the runners up from National League 2 South (at the home ground of the club with the superior league record) for the final promotion place.

The league title ended up going to Fylde who finished 14 points clear of runners up Loughborough Students - quite a turnaround for a team that finished 9th the season before.  Although there were 14 points between the two sides, Fylde actually only won one more game, but in the end it was the accumulating of bonus points that really pulled the Lancashire side clear, as they claimed 28 to Loughborough Students 23 (almost one a game).  As well as being the best team in the division Fylde also pulled in the most fans with almost 14,000 supporters attending Woodlands over the course of the season (a great record for a division which had seen dwindling attendances over the years).  Loughborough Students did have a second chance to go up against the 2010–11 National League 2 South runners up Jersey, but lost heavily away at St.  Peter in front of a large crowd of over 3,000, to consign the Students to another year in National League 2 North, in what was their second playoff defeat in a row.

At the bottom of the table, Manchester had another shocking season, comfortably the worst team in the division with no points (not even bonus points) occurred with almost 2,000 points conceded, and suffering their fourth consecutive relegation since they dropped from the 2008–09 National Division One (now the Championship) in what was the worst overall league performance in the division since league rugby began.  Rugby Lions were little better, with two of their three wins coming against the hapless Manchester, going down as the second relegated team with just 20 points, for what was their second relegation in a row.  The final spot was far more competitive, with five teams separated by just 2 points but in a dramatic final game (which had been rescheduled from February), Hull Ionians managed to beat Morley away from home 27 - 25 and send the newly promoted Maroons back to their former league.  Manchester and Rugby Lions would drop down to National League 3 North while Rugby Lions fell to National League 3 Midlands.

Participating teams and locations

Twelve of the teams listed below participated in the 2009–10 National League 2 North season; Manchester and Nuneaton were relegated from the 2009–10 National League 1 while Luctonians came up as playoff winners from National League 3 Midlands along with Morley who were champions of National League 3 North.  Ampthill had finished 2009-10 as champions of National League 3 Midlands and would have joined National League 2 North or the 2010–11 National League 2 South had they not been found in breach of regulations during a league game which cost them both the league title and promotion.

Final league table

Results

Round 1

Round 2

Round 3

Round 4

Round 5

Round 6

Round 7

Round 8

Round 9

Round 10

Round 11

Round 12

Round 13 

Postponed.  Game rescheduled to 5 February 2011.

Postponed.  Game rescheduled to 5 February 2011.

Postponed.  Game rescheduled to 5 February 2011.

Postponed.  Game rescheduled to 5 February 2011.

Postponed.  Game rescheduled to 5 February 2011.

Postponed.  Game rescheduled to 5 February 2011.

Postponed.  Game rescheduled to 5 February 2011.

Round 14 

Postponed.  Game rescheduled to 26 February 2011.

Postponed.  Game rescheduled to 26 February 2011.

Postponed.  Game rescheduled to 26 February 2011.

Postponed.  Game rescheduled to 21 May 2011.

Postponed.  Game rescheduled to 26 February 2011.

Postponed.  Game rescheduled to 26 February 2011.

Postponed.  Game rescheduled to 26 February 2011.

Postponed.  Game rescheduled to 26 February 2011.

Round 15 

Postponed.  Game rescheduled to 19 March 2011.

Round 16 

Postponed.  Game rescheduled to 7 May 2011.

Postponed.  Game rescheduled to 19 March 2011.

Postponed.  Game rescheduled to 19 March 2011.

Postponed.  Game rescheduled to 19 March 2011.

Postponed.  Game rescheduled to 19 March 2011.

Postponed.  Game rescheduled to 7 May 2011.

Postponed.  Game rescheduled to 19 March 2011.

Postponed.  Game rescheduled to 19 March 2011.

Round 17 

Postponed.  Game rescheduled to 14 May 2011.

Round 18

Round 19 

Postponed.  Game rescheduled to 21 May 2011.

Round 20 

Postponed.  Game rescheduled to 14 May 2011.

Postponed.  Game rescheduled to 7 May 2011.

Postponed.  Game rescheduled to 14 May 2011.

Game would initially be postponed but due to fixture congestion it would ultimately be cancelled due to the result not affecting the overall league table.

Round 13 (rescheduled games) 

Game rescheduled from 27 November 2010.

Game rescheduled from 27 November 2010.

Game rescheduled from 27 November 2010.

Game rescheduled from 27 November 2010.

Game rescheduled from 27 November 2010.

Game rescheduled from 27 November 2010.

Game rescheduled from 27 November 2010.

Round 21

Round 22 

Postponed.  Game rescheduled to 21 May 2011.

Postponed.  Game rescheduled to 21 May 2011.

Round 14 (rescheduled games) 

Game rescheduled from 4 December 2010.

Game rescheduled from 4 December 2010.

Game rescheduled from 4 December 2010.

Game rescheduled from 4 December 2010.

Game rescheduled from 4 December 2010.

Game rescheduled from 4 December 2010.

Game rescheduled from 4 December 2010.

Round 23 

Postponed.  Game rescheduled to 14 May 2011.

Round 24

Rounds 15 & 16 (rescheduled games) 

Game rescheduled from 11 December 2010.

Game rescheduled from 18 December 2010.

Game rescheduled from 18 December 2010.

Game rescheduled from 18 December 2010.

Game rescheduled from 18 December 2010.

Game rescheduled from 18 December 2010.

Game rescheduled from 18 December 2010.

Round 25

Round 26

Round 27

Round 28

Round 29

Round 30

Rounds 16 & 20 (rescheduled games) 

Game rescheduled from 18 December 2010.

Game rescheduled from 29 January 2011.

Game rescheduled from 18 December 2010.

Rounds 17, 20 & 23 (rescheduled games) 

Game rescheduled from 29 January 2011.

Game rescheduled from 8 January 2010.

Game rescheduled from 5 March 2011.

Game rescheduled from 29 January 2011.

Rounds 14, 19 & 22 (rescheduled games) 

Game rescheduled from 19 February 2011.

Game rescheduled from 22 January 2011.

Game rescheduled from 4 December 2010.

Game rescheduled from 19 February 2011.

Promotion play-off
Each season, the runners-up in the National League 2 North and National League 2 South participate in a play-off for promotion into National League 1.  Jersey were runners-up in the South and would host the game as they had a better record in the league in comparison to the North runners up Loughborough Students.

Total season attendances

Individual statistics 

 Note that points scorers includes tries as well as conversions, penalties and drop goals.

Top points scorers

Top try scorers

Season records

Team
Largest home win — 118 pts
118 - 0  Fylde at home to Manchester on 16 April 2011
Largest away win — 86 pts
92 - 6  Fylde away to Manchester on 26 February 2011
Most points scored — 118 pts
118 - 0  Fylde at home to Manchester on 16 April 2011
Most tries in a match — 18 
Fylde at home to Manchester on 16 April 2011
Most conversions in a match — 14
Fylde at home to Manchester on 16 April 2011
Most penalties in a match — 6
Caldy at home to Preston Grasshoppers on 11 December 2010
Most drop goals in a match — 2 (x2)
Nuneaton at home to Leicester Lions on 11 September 2010
Preston Grasshoppers at home to Hull Ionians on 16 October 2010

Player
Most points in a match — 37
 Gavin Roberts for Caldy at home to Manchester on 2 April 2011
Most tries in a match — 6
 Gareth Collins for Leicester Lions at home to Hull Ionians on 13 November 2010
Most conversions in a match — 14
 Stephen Collins for Fylde at home to Manchester on 16 April 2011
Most penalties in a match — 6
 Richard Vasey for Caldy at home to Preston Grasshoppers on 11 December 2010
Most drop goals in a match — 2 (x2)
 Lee Chapman for Nuneaton at home to Leicester Lions on 11 September 2010
 Mark Edwards for Preston Grasshoppers at home to Hull Ionians on 16 October 2010

Attendances
Highest — 2,415
Fylde at home to Preston Grasshoppers on 11 September 2010
Lowest — 50 
Huddersfield at home to Hull Ionians on 11 December 2010
Highest Average Attendance — 921
Fylde
Lowest Average Attendance — 126
Leicester Lions

See also
 English Rugby Union Leagues
 English rugby union system
 Rugby union in England

References

External links
 NCA Rugby

2010-11
2010–11 in English rugby union leagues